Francisca Beretervide (1886-1976) was an Uruguayan chemist, educator, author, lawyer, and feminist. She is noted for her role in advancing women's rights in Uruguay. Beretervide's works alongside Paulina Luisi and Isabel Pinto de Vidal paved the way for women's suffrage in her country.

Biography 
Beretervide was born on 6 June 1886 at Flores Department, Uruguay to José Beretervide and Francisca Torterolo. After completing her secondary education, she was admitted to the University of the Republic where she graduated with a degree in Pharmaceutical Chemistry. She then continued her education and joined the university's School of Law, where she completed her Doctor of Law degree in 1917.

Beretervide became the dean of the Women's University in Montevideo from 1917 to 1922. She replaced Clotilde Luisi, the first female dean of the university. She was also a founding member of the Consejo Nacional de Mujeres, a branch of the International Council of Women. She served as the organization's secretary general.

Beretervide died 31 October 1976 in Montevideo. In 2001, the city of Montevideo named a public space after her. The triangular space, which is called Espacio Libre Doctora Francisca Beretervide, is a designated recreation area near Atahualpa and the Cantero Doctor Alvaro Carbone.

Works 
As part of her feminist activities, she wrote several articles for Accion Femenina, which promoted women's rights and networking opportunities for women and feminist organizations around the world. Her published works also included papers covering chemistry and social justice.

Publication 

 Legal Nature of the Vessels (1915), Journal of Law and Social Sciences

References 

1886 births
1976 deaths
People from Montevideo
Writers from Montevideo
20th-century women lawyers
Uruguayan feminists
Uruguayan suffragists